Hydrotaea aenescens, known generally as black dump fly, is a species in the family Muscidae. Other common names include the black garbage fly and dump fly. It is found in Europe.  Larvae of this species are predators of Musca domestica. The adults are known vectors of human botfly eggs.

References

Muscidae
Muscomorph flies of Europe
Insects described in 1830
Taxa named by Christian Rudolph Wilhelm Wiedemann
Articles created by Qbugbot